Article 6 of the 1977 Soviet Constitution placed limitations on the political rights of Soviet citizens. While the rest of the constitution theoretically assured the public freedom of speech, freedom of assembly and freedom of press these rights were rendered less meaningful by the reservation of article 6 that the Communist Party of the Soviet Union was the "leading and guiding force of the Soviet society".

The text of the article follows in English translation.

The leading and guiding force of the Soviet society and the nucleus of its political system, of all state organisations and public organisations, is the Communist Party of the Soviet Union. The CPSU exists for the people and serves the people. 

The Communist Party, armed with Marxism–Leninism, determines the general perspectives of the development of society and the course of the home and foreign policy of the USSR, directs the great constructive work of the Soviet people, and imparts a planned, systematic and theoretically substantiated character to their struggle for the victory of communism. 

All party organisations shall function within the framework of the Constitution of the USSR.

This provision was used to justify the ban on other parties, as well as harsh measures against opposition of any sort.  The theory was that since the CPSU was the vanguard of the state, its right to rule could not be legitimately questioned.

The "leading role" of the CPSU was first enshrined in Article 126 of the Stalin Constitution, which described the Party as "the vanguard of the working people in their struggle to strengthen and develop the socialist system and is the leading core of all organizations of the working people, both public and state." 

On March 14, 1990 Article 6 was amended by the 3rd Extraordinary Congress of People's Deputies of the Soviet Union, to read as follows:

The Communist Party of the Soviet Union, other political parties as well as labor, youth and other public organisations and mass movements, through their representatives elected to the Councils of People's Deputies and in other forms participate in the policy-making of the Soviet state, in the management of state and public affairs.

This move was introduced by Mikhail Gorbachev in tandem with the creation of the office of the president of the USSR (which he viewed largely as an office for himself), and as a means to formalize the transition to a multi-party political system. After the amending of Article 6 of the Constitution, the CPSU effectively lost its right to rule the Soviet Union's government apparatus; paving the way towards a multi-party democracy.

References 

Soviet law
1977 in law
1977 in the Soviet Union